Sinde (ward) is an administrative ward in the Mbeya Urban district of the Mbeya Region of Tanzania. In 2016 the Tanzania National Bureau of Statistics report there were 7,730 people in the ward, from 7,014 in 2012.

Neighborhoods 
The ward has 4 neighborhoods.
 Ilolo Kati
 Janibichi
 Kagwina
 Sinde A

References 

Wards of Mbeya Region